Wiki Loves Folklore (WLF) is an annual international photographic competition held during the month of February, organised worldwide by Wikipedia community members with the help of local Wikimedia affiliates across the globe. Participants take pictures of local folk culture and intangible heritage in their region, and upload them to Wikimedia Commons. The aim of event is to document folklore traditions around the world with a goal to encourage people to capture media of their local Folk culture, and to put them under a free licence which can then be re-used not only in Wikipedia but everywhere by everyone.

See also 
Wiki Loves Folklore on Wikimedia Commons
Wiki Loves Love 2019 winners
Wiki Loves Folklore 2020 winners
Wiki Loves Folklore 2021 winners

References 

Recurring events established in 2019
Wiki communities